Uch Qui (also Romanized as Ūch Qū’ī) is a village in Atrak Rural District, Dashli Borun District, Gonbad-e Qabus County, Golestan Province, Iran. At the 2006 census, its population was 611, in 98 families.

References 

Populated places in Gonbad-e Kavus County